The Vagaikulam Bird Habitat is an Indian wildlife refuge, located to west of Alwarkurichi, Tamil Nadu, India.

History
Vaigaikulam receives water from Ramanadhi dam. In 1996 many babul trees were planted in the area by the Social Forestry division of Tamil Nadu forest department. In 2008, most of the trees were removed, but due to media coverage of danger to the area's birds, 20% of the trees were saved. Based on research conducted by Ashoka Trust for Research in Ecology and the Environment (ATREE) it was found that Vaigaikulam had the potential to become a bird sanctuary like nearby Koonthankulam. ATREE the began working with community students to monitor the refuge's bird population.

Bird species
Bird species like Black headed Ibis, Glossy Ibis, Night Heron, Indian Cormorant, Little cormorant have been observed in the refuge. Garganey, Northern Shoveler, Pintail, Rosy Pastor have been observed in the winter, having migrated from southern Russia.

References

Bird sanctuaries of Tamil Nadu
Protected areas of Tamil Nadu
Protected areas with year of establishment missing
Tenkasi district